1996 Júbilo Iwata season

Review and events

League results summary

League results by round

Competitions

Domestic results

J.League

Emperor's Cup

J.League Cup

Player statistics

 † player(s) joined the team after the opening of this season.

Transfers

In:

Out:

Transfers during the season

In

Out

Awards

J.League Best XI:  Hiroshi Nanami

References

Other pages
 J. League official site
 Júbilo Iwata official site

Jubilo Iwata
Júbilo Iwata seasons